The 1970 TVW Channel 7 Six Hour Le Mans was an endurance race for Sports Cars, Improved Production Touring Cars & Series Production Touring Cars. The event was held at the Wanneroo Park circuit in Western Australia on 1 June 1970 with forty cars lining up for the modified Le Mans type start. Results for the race are shown below.

References 

A History Of Australian Motor Sport, © 1980
Around The Houses, © 1980
Racing Car News, August 1970
Terry Walker's Place

Six Hours Le Mans
Six Hours Le Mans
June 1970 sports events in Australia